Woodhenge is a Neolithic Class II henge and timber circle monument within the Stonehenge World Heritage Site in Wiltshire, England.

Woodhenge may also refer to:

Archaeology
 A general term for a timber circle
 Cahokia Woodhenge, near Collinsville, Illinois
 Moorehead Circle, near Lebanon, Ohio
 The woodhenge at Zwolle, Northeastern Netherlands

Other uses
 Woodhenge, a song the 1979 album Platinum by Mike Oldfield